Juan Manuel Sánchez de Castro (born 18 April 1965) is a Spanish sprint canoer who competed from the late 1980s to the mid-1990s. He won a complete set of medals at the ICF Canoe Sprint World Championships with a gold (K-2 500 m: 1991), a silver (K-2 1000 m: 1991), and a bronze (K-2 500 m: 1993).

Sánchez also competed in four Summer Olympics, earning his best finish of fourth in the K-2 500 m event at Barcelona in 1992.

References

1965 births
Canoeists at the 1984 Summer Olympics
Canoeists at the 1988 Summer Olympics
Canoeists at the 1992 Summer Olympics
Canoeists at the 1996 Summer Olympics
Living people
Olympic canoeists of Spain
Spanish male canoeists
ICF Canoe Sprint World Championships medalists in kayak
20th-century Spanish people